The 1995 Wales rugby union tour was a series of matches played in August and September 1995 in South Africa by the Wales national team. The tour consisted of two matches; a warm-up game against the South-East Transvaal provincial side, and a test match against the South African national team. The tour was held in part to thank South Africa for supporting Wales' bid to host the 1999 Rugby World Cup.

Wales named a squad of 24 players for the tour, including five uncapped players. Ten of the squad had not been included in the Wales team that participated in the 1995 Rugby World Cup during May and June. Jonathan Humphreys was named the captain, despite only having played for the national team on two previous occasions.

Wales' only warm-up game was against South-East Transvaal on 29 August in Witbank. At the time, South-East Transvaal were playing in the third division of the Currie Cup, South Africa's provincial competition. They came into the game having won eleven successive matches in the competition. South-East Transvaal won the game comfortably by 47 points to 6. They scored five tries, and fly-half Jacques Benade kicked all five conversions as well as three penalties and a drop-goal. Wales' only points came through two penalties kicked by their fly-half Aled Williams.

The test match against South Africa took place on 2 September at Ellis Park Stadium in Johannesburg. This was a week after the sport was declared "open" with restrictions on payments to players removed, making it the first test match of rugby union's professional era. This was the ninth test match between the countries, but only the second match since 1970. South Africa had won seven of the previous encounters, with one draw between the sides. As the reigning world champions following their victory in June, South Africa were overwhelming favourites to win the match.

South Africa won the game by 40 points to 11. Wales had taken an early lead when Mark Bennett scored a try in the third minute, immediately following which South Africa lock Kobus Wiese punched an unsighted Derwyn Jones, knocking him out. The incident was missed by the officials, and Wiese was not sanctioned during the match. South Africa responded through tries from Wiese and Francois Pienaar, and at half-time led by 18 points to 8. In the second-half, Wales' Neil Jenkins kicked a penalty to reduce the gap to seven points. South Africa then scored three tries in seven minutes to extend their lead to 29 points. A minute before the end of the match, Wales' Garin Jenkins punched South Africa's Joost van der Westhuizen. The punch, which knocked out van der Westhuizen resulted in Jenkins being sent off by the referee.

Following the game, Wales invoked citing procedures against Wiese for the punch against Derwyn Jones. As a result of receiving a red card, Garin Jenkins also faced disciplinary proceedings. Both Wiese and Jenkins were banned from playing rugby for 30 days for their actions.

Results 
Scores and results list Wales's points tally first.

References

1995 rugby union tours
1994–95 in Welsh rugby union
1995
1995 in South African rugby union
1995
History of rugby union matches between South Africa and Wales